Captain George Manners (4 June 1747 – 27 June 1772) was a British soldier and politician, the illegitimate son of John Manners, Marquess of Granby and Ann Mompesson.

Manners was enrolled at Eton from 7 July 1757 until 1762. He served as a cornet in the Blues during the Seven Years' War, and became junior captain of the 3rd King's Dragoons on 4 August 1767.
In 1768, he was elected as Member of Parliament for Scarborough, a borough frequently in the Manners interest. Manners retired from the Army on 13 August 1771, but continued to represent Scarborough until his death in 1772.

Manners' sister was Anne, the illegitimate daughter of John Manners, Marquess of Granby. She married her first cousin John Manners-Sutton.

References

1740s births
1772 deaths
3rd The King's Own Hussars officers
Members of the Parliament of Great Britain for English constituencies
People educated at Eton College
British Army personnel of the Seven Years' War
Royal Horse Guards officers
G
British MPs 1768–1774